The Madness of King George: The Ingenious Insanity of Our Most "Misunderestimated" President is a political satire book written by Michael K. Smith and illustrated by Matt Wuerker. It was published in 2004 by Common Courage Press in Canada. Alternating between text and cartoons, it takes a critical look at George W. Bush's life and first term as president of the United States, portraying it all as a rush to war in Iraq.

2004 non-fiction books
American political books
Books about the 2003 invasion of Iraq
Books about George W. Bush
American non-fiction books